In the early morning hours of December 9, 2007, 24-year-old Matthew John Murray opened fire at the Youth With A Mission training center in Arvada, Colorado, killing two and wounding two others before escaping. Later that afternoon, he attacked the New Life Church in Colorado Springs, Colorado, with a number of firearms, killing two more people and injuring three before being shot by Jeanne Assam, a member of the church's safety team. Murray then committed suicide by shooting himself in the head.

Shootings

Arvada missionary shooting
Around 12:30 a.m. MST (07:30 UTC), following a Christmas banquet that had taken place earlier that night, Matthew Murray knocked on the door of the Youth With A Mission facility. Murray asked personnel in the youth center if he could stay overnight; when he was refused, Murray opened fire with a 9mm handgun, killing Tiffany Johnson, the center's Director of Hospitality, and staff member Philip Crouse, as well as wounding Dan Griebenow in the neck and Charlie Blanch in the leg.

After the incident, the YWAM base evacuated its 80 people to the mountain campus in Black Hawk, 45 of whom were in the building at the time of the shooting. Local police quickly conducted a canine search of the surrounding area, searching for the shooter; they hoped that fresh snow would help them track the suspect, but were unable to locate him. A reverse 911 call went out to residents of the neighborhood to let them know a shooting suspect might be in their area.

New Life Church shooting

At about 1:00 p.m. MST (20:00 UTC), more than thirty minutes after the 11:00 a.m. sermon had ended at New Life Church, Murray opened fire in the church parking lot with a Bushmaster XM-15 rifle, shooting at the Works family as they entered their vehicle. He killed Stephanie Works, 18, and Rachel Works, 16, and critically wounded their father, David Works, by shooting him multiple times.

Church member and bystander Judy Purcell was wounded in the shoulder when attempting to enter her vehicle; she survived her injuries. Murray directed gunfire towards other vehicles during his shooting spree within the New Life Church parking lot, including narrowly missing church patron Christina Wilke after riddling her vehicle with a volley of bullets from his semi-automatic rifle, missing Wilke with his gunfire by approximately four inches. Murray then entered the building's main foyer where he wounded Larry Bourbonnais, as Bourbonnais was attempting to yell at Murray to distract Murray from hurting others; Bourbonnais was minorly wounded in the forearm with shrapnel. At this point, church member Jeanne Assam, a New Life Church security volunteer, who was herself a former Minneapolis Police Department law enforcement officer, opened fire upon Murray. Assam shot Murray 10 times, striking him in both the femoral and carotid arteries using her Beretta 92 FS 9mm handgun. The incident was fully witnessed by Larry Bourbonnais, who later repeatedly conveyed to national news interests that, "It was the bravest thing I've ever seen." Assam later publicly acknowledged that she had asked God to be with her as she took on this active shooter. Murray then fatally shot himself in the head with the same handgun he used in the earlier YWAM shooting. He fired a total of 42 rounds during the entire shooting spree; 15 at YWAM and 27 at New Life Church, including the self-inflicted shot.

Aftermath
After the New Life Church shooting, Assam later stated that "God guided me and protected me [and I] did not think for a minute to run away" when a reporter asked her if she had.

On December 13, 2007, Murray's family issued a statement saying that it was "groping for answers" and issued an apology.

The pastor of the church stated that Assam shot Murray before he entered  inside the building, after she encountered him in the hallway, and that Assam probably saved "over 100 lives."

Following the shooting spree, Colorado Springs Police Department officers searched the church campus looking for suspicious devices. Colorado governor Bill Ritter ordered state authorities to help investigate. The FBI and the Bureau of Alcohol, Tobacco, Firearms and Explosives also came to the site to assist.

However, prior to the second shooting, police were already conducting an investigation at Murray's home.

Police said the description of the gunman in the second shooting was similar to the first: a white male wearing a dark hat and dark jacket.

Victims

Perpetrator
Matthew John Murray, a 24-year-old resident of Englewood, Colorado, was identified as the perpetrator of both shootings. Murray was homeschooled in a deeply religious Christian household after the 1st grade, and he attended, but did not complete, a missionary training program at the YWAM Arvada facility 2002. He was expelled from the school due to "strange behavior," which included playing perceived-frightening rock music and him claiming to hear voices. Court records indicated that Murray was bitter over his expulsion from the 12-week missionary training program, as he was consequently banned from attending a field trip to Bosnia. His expulsion from the school was confirmed by Cheryl Morrison, whose husband, George Morrison, is pastor of the Faith Bible Chapel adjacent to YWAM Denver. She didn't know specifics of the conflict. "I don't think that 'run-in' is the word, but they did have to dismiss him. It had to be something of significance, because they go the nth degree with people."

Before the second shooting, Murray left several violent and threatening messages on several religious websites, espousing his hatred for fundamental Christianity and his intentions on killing as many Christians as possible. One message quoted Eric Harris, one of the perpetrators of the Columbine High School massacre; it read: "I'm coming for EVERYONE soon and I WILL be armed to the ...teeth and I WILL shoot to kill. ...God, I can't wait till I can kill you people. Feel no remorse, no sense of shame, I don't care if I live or die in the shoot-out. All I want to do is kill and injure as many of you ... as I can especially Christians who are to blame for most of the problems in the world." In his online postings, Murray alleges psychological abuse at the hands of his parents and church leaders as the main reason for his hatred of Christianity.

Murray was obsessed with several school shootings and mass shootings. Additionally, hundreds of images of pornography and child pornography were found on his computer by investigators. He had also researched Children of God (COG) cult member Ricky Rodriguez. Before the shooting at New Life, Murray called a family member and confessed to his obsession with mass shootings.

In the months before the shootings, Murray acquired several weapons: an AK-47 semi-automatic variant, a Beretta .22-caliber handgun, a Beretta .40-caliber handgun, a Springfield Armory 9mm handgun, and a Bushmaster XM-15 .223-caliber rifle, which he had modified to fire a larger caliber round. He was found to have had over 3,000 rounds of ammunition at New Life and had over 1,000 more at his home in Englewood.

In another of his very last posts, made that morning to a Usenet newsgroup, he identified himself as being a member of a local branch of the Ordo Templi Orientis. According to the chapter leader, Murray had attended their events for one or two years, but his request for membership was turned down and he was asked to leave in either September or October.

Murray was involved in several religious organizations in the Denver area, including: His Love Fellowship Church, Prince of Peace Church of the Brethren, Trinity Christian, Ordo Templi Orientis, and the New Life Church. He was also baptized into the Church of Jesus Christ of Latter-day Saints (LDS Church) in late 2006, according to the church's records.

Murray was diagnosed with ADHD at the age of five. According to investigators, he descended into extreme anti-Christian psychosis over a period of several months, and his web-postings became increasingly violent, despondent and hateful. Some of the users tried to counsel Murray. After the killing, police found a letter addressed "To God," by Murray, in his car, which was later obtained by Newsradio 850 KOA. The letter was found along with two books: I Had to Say Something by Mike Jones and Serial Murderers and Their Victims by Eric W. Hickey, according to the invoice.

Murray was buried during a private funeral service for close friends and family soon after the shooting.

References

External links
 Max Blumenthal, The Nightmare of Christianity The Nation (September 9, 2009)

2007 murders in the United States
2007 in Colorado
Attacks on churches in North America
Arvada, Colorado
Deaths by firearm in Colorado
Spree shootings in the United States
2007 mass shootings in the United States
Mass shootings in the United States
Murder–suicides in Colorado
Murder in Colorado
Events in Colorado Springs, Colorado
Defensive gun use
Crimes in Colorado
Anti-Christian sentiment in the United States
Attacks in the United States in 2007
December 2007 events in the United States
Mass shootings in Colorado
Attacks on religious buildings and structures in the United States
Mass murder in Colorado
Mass murder in the United States
Columbine High School massacre copycat crimes